Barandud (also Romanized as Barandūd) is a village in Qohestan Rural District, Qohestan District, Darmian County, South Khorasan Province, Iran. At the 2006 census, its population was 296, in 80 families.

References 

Populated places in Darmian County